Lime Lake or Lake Lime may refer to:

Inhabited places
Lime Lake, New York, United States
Lime Lake Township, Murray County, Minnesota, United States
Lime Lake, in the municipality of Tweed, Ontario, Canada

Lakes in the United States
Lime Lake (Sarasota, Florida)
Lime Lake (Michigan)
Lime Lake (Murray County, Minnesota)
Lime Lake (New York)
Lime Lake (Pend Oreille County, Washington)
Lake Lime (Wisconsin)